Manchivadu is a 1974 India Telugu-language drama film, produced by T. Govindarajan under the Venus Combines banner and directed by V. Madhusudhana Rao. It stars Akkineni Nageswara Rao, Vanisri and Kanchana, with music composed by K. V. Mahadevan. The film is a remake of the Kannada movie Baalu Belagithu (1970).

Plot
Chandra is a poor girl who lives with her ailing mother. Once when she is out to buy medicine for her mother, a goon tries to outrage her modesty and follows her to her house. Satyam is also a poor youth. Incidentally, he comes across Chandra and saves her from the clutches of the goon. At the request of the dying old lady, Satyam promises to take care of her daughter. To keep his promise, Satyam takes care of Chandra. However, soon society starts questioning their relationship. In a fit of rage, Satyam marries Chandra in a temple. The newly-wedded woman knows nothing about her husband and thus asks him about his work and designation. He tells her that he works in Ratan Mahal in different positions according to the demand of the situation.

But unfortunately, he is the owner of Ratan Mahal, with a six-year-old daughter Rani and his wife Lalitha is a mental patient who is under treatment in a psychiatric center. Raju is a gang leader who forces young girls to blackmail rich men and one Anand is in search of him with help of his friend Chakram.

After some time, Chandra gives birth to a baby boy and Lalitha recovers from her mental illness. However, the doctor warns them that any kind of shock would affect her health again. After returning home, Lalitha insists on visiting a temple. Inside the temple premises, Rani gets lost and coincidentally, Chandra takes her back to her mother. For this act of kindness, Lalitha develops a friendship with Chandra and invites her to Ratan Mahal. Both the ladies also talk about their respective husbands. Things take a shocking turn when Chandra's baby is ill and reaches Ratan Mahal to find her husband Satyam playing Anand, the husband of Lalitha and the boss of the Ratan Mahal. She accuses him of cheating on both women. After recalling the doctor's warning to not give any shock to Lalitha, he denies playing a double role. He tells Chandra that he is Anand and does not know anything about her.

Later, Chandra leaves a letter for her husband informing him about their son's death and goes missing. On the other hand, Anand needs to visit Bangalore for accomplishing his secret mission of finding the murderer. Lalitha insists on going with him. He could not deny the request and thus takes his wife and daughter to Bangalore. They check into a hotel where Anand receives a call from his assistant regarding their secret mission. Lalitha hears their conversation and she again falls ill. Anand calls for a doctor. He is shocked to see Chandra as the nurse, who is known as Sita.

Finally, Anand is about to succeed in his mission when Raju informs him that his wife and daughter are kidnapped. Anand and Chakram come to the kidnapper and finally, Raju is arrested. Now, the case is in the court where Anand is standing in the witness box and narrating a story. Once Anand and Lalitha visit their estate where they met with an accident, a look-alike of him, Satyam saved the baby. Then Anand learned that he was Satyam and works as a laborer in their estate. Meanwhile, Anand sees that Lalitha was lying unconscious on the road. Anand asks Satyam to take care of the baby and sets out to take Lalitha to a doctor. On the way, his ex-girlfriend Mala stops his car and demands a heavy ransom. She calls him to a hotel to receive the money. In the hotel, she tells Anand about Raju, who had forced her to blackmail him. At the same time, Raju arrived and shot her dead and the blame comes to Anand. Now, Anand asks Satyam to act as Anand and to stay at the Ratan Mahal. Satyam promised that he would never let anyone know about the name exchange. After listening to Anand, the judge frees him and gives the death sentence to the criminal Raju. In the end, Anand and Satyam decide to stay together like brothers.

Cast
Akkineni Nageswara Rao as Anand and Satyam (dual role)
Vanisri as Chandra
Kanchana as Lalitha
Satyanarayana as Raju
Raja Babu as Chakram
Padmanabham as Bangaram Seth 
Mada as Hotel Manager 
Balakrishna
Rama Prabha as Sakhubhai
Halam as item number
Baby Sumathi as Rani

Crew
Art: S. Krishna Rao
Choreography: Heeralal, Sundaram
Dialogues: Acharya Aatreya 
Lyrics: C. Narayana Reddy, Acharya Aatreya, Dasaradhi
Playback: Ghantasala, P. Susheela, M. Rama Rao
Music: K. V. Mahadevan
Story: P. Krishnan
Editing: K. Satyam
Cinematography: P. S. Selvaraj
Producer: T. Govindarajan
Screenplay - Director: V. Madhusudhana Rao
Banner: Venus Combines
Release Date: 21 February 1974

Soundtrack

Music composed by K. V. Mahadevan. Music released on Audio Company.

References

External links
 

Indian action drama films
Films directed by V. Madhusudhana Rao
Telugu remakes of Kannada films
Films scored by K. V. Mahadevan
1970s Telugu-language films
1970s action drama films